The 2017–18 First Women's Basketball League of Serbia is the 12th season of the First Women's Basketball League of Serbia, the highest professional basketball league in Serbia. It is also 74th national championship played by Serbian clubs inclusive of nation's previous incarnations as Yugoslavia and Serbia and Montenegro.

The first half of the season consists of 12 teams and 132-game regular season (22 games for each of the 12 teams).

Teams

Venues and locations

Regular season

Standings

Playoffs 
Source: Srbijasport

Bracket

Semifinals 

|}

Finals 

|}

See also
 2017–18 Milan Ciga Vasojević Cup
 2017–18 Basketball League of Serbia
 2017–18 WABA League

References

External links
 Official website
 League Standings at eurobasket.com
 League Standings at srbijasport.net

First Women's Basketball League of Serbia seasons
Serbia
Basketball